PacketExchange is a British multinational network services provider based in London.  Founded in 2002 by Jason Velody and Kieron O'Brien who were supported by Nigel Titley, Giles Heron, and Katie Snowball as the founder team, its network connected 45 points of presence across Europe, Asia and the United States over a private backbone consisting primarily of multiple 10 Gigabit Ethernet links over dedicated wavelengths on a fiber-optic mesh. 

PacketExchange's services include Ethernet Private Line (both EPL and EVPL), wide-area peering, community of interest networking, content delivery network, single and multi-homed Internet transit and dedicated Internet access. The company also offers expertise in peering/BGP and infrastructure to support cloud computing.

The company headquarters are in London, UK, with offices in the United States.

Company history
The company was founded to act as a wide-area Internet Exchange Point and application delivery service provider. The company's original business model was to use Ethernet and MPLS technology to build a distributed Internet Exchange Point as well as to provide point to point Ethernet connectivity. This model was reasonably successful, with over 140 networks peering traffic over the PacketExchange network. The commoditization of the IP market forced the company to evolve.

In January 2005, PacketExchange acquired and integrated XchangePoint.
In October 2007, PacketExchange was hired by the rock band Radiohead for the internet release of their album In Rainbows. In February 2008, Rick Mace became the new CEO, and simultaneously PacketExchange secured an additional $12 million investment. The company added two network points of presence during 2008: one in the Telx colocation facility in New York and another in Singapore. 

In January 2010, Mzima Networks announced that its network assets were acquired by PacketExchange. Grant Kirkwood became PacketExchange's CTO. The two companies merged customer bases and operations, resulting in a combined company with an extensive global network footprint that leverages its 10 Gigabit backbone to provide global Ethernet private line services, MPLS and VPLS networking, IP transit and peering services.

Mzima Networks
The Mzima Network was a data network and Internet Protocol (IP) computer network extending across the United States, Europe and Asia. The word Mzima means “alive” in the Kiswahili language.

The network was started in California in 2001 by Mzima Corporation, N.A which acquired several companies with Internet networks.  In 2005 the Mzima Network became the first all-10 Gigabit Ethernet backbone through a partnership with Force10 Networks.  The Mzima IP backbone network expanded into Europe in 2006 providing connectivity for content providers, enterprise companies, and international telecommunication carriers.  The fault-tolerant designed backbone network, connected Tier 1 network carriers and network providers that engage in private peering.

It incorporated the Provider Backbone Bridge Traffic Engineering (PBB-TE) standard to adapt Ethernet technology to carrier networks.
PBB-TE technology was incorporated into communications networking equipment by such companies as Ciena Corporation. This Ethernet technology provided fast re-route capabilities allowing optimization of unused network capacity.  Since it provided an alternative to Tier 1 service providers and multi-homed networks, the Mzima Network claimed route-optimized transit and private peering. 

In January 2010 Mzima Networks announced its network assets were acquired by PacketExchange.  The two companies merged customer bases and operations.

Acquisition
In May 2011, Global Telecom & Technology (GTT) acquired PacketExchange for 20 million USD in cash.

See also 
 List of Internet exchange points

References

 PacketExchange, October 21, 2008; "PacketExchange Launches Global Network Services in Singapore".
 Reuters, May 29, 2008; "PacketExchange Launches Services at Telx in New York".
 Information Week, February 11, 2008; "PacketExchange Grabs $12 Million Investment... And CEO"
 Digital50, October 11, 2007; "PacketExchange Brings New Radiohead Album to Fans Around the Globe in Record Time".
 Telecommunications Magazine. May 2005. PacketExchange: without peers?

External links
 Official Site (2002 copy on archive.org)

Internet exchange points in the United Kingdom
Internet service providers of the United Kingdom
Companies established in 2002
2002 establishments in England